The 2009 Indy Japan 300 was the sixteenth round of the 2009 IndyCar Series season, and was held on September 19, 2009 at the  Twin Ring Motegi, in Motegi, Japan.

Grid 

** Note: Kanaan originally qualified 14th, but failed post-qualifying inspection. As a result, Kanaan was forced to start from the rear of the field.

Race

Standings after the race 

Drivers' Championship standings

References 

Indy Japan 300
Indy
Indy Japan 300
Indy Japan 300